Venla Niemi (aka Venla Harju; born 10 July 1990) is a Finnish orienteering competitor.

She became Junior World Champion in the middle distance in Gothenburg in 2008, ahead of silver medalist Beata Falk.

She competed at the 2012 World Orienteering Championships. In the sprint competition she qualified for the final, where she placed sixth.

At the 2017 World Orienteering Championships in Tartu, Estonia, Harju placed fourth in the sprint final, and won a bronze medal in the middle distance (behind Tove Alexandersson and Marianne Andersen).

References

External links

Living people
Finnish orienteers
Female orienteers
Foot orienteers
World Orienteering Championships medalists
1990 births
Junior World Orienteering Championships medalists